Botetourt County Public Schools is the school district serving Botetourt County, Virginia.

Schools

Secondary (Grades 9-12)
Botetourt Technical Education Center (BTEC)
James River High School - Buchanan/Springwood
Lord Botetourt High School - Daleville

Middle (Grades 6-8)
Central Academy Middle School - Fincastle
Read Mountain Middle School- Cloverdale

Elementary (Grades K-5)
Breckenridge Elementary School - Fincastle
Buchanan Elementary School - Buchanan
Cloverdale Elementary School - Cloverdale
Colonial Elementary School - Blue Ridge
Eagle Rock Elementary School - Eagle Rock
Greenfield Elementary School - Daleville
Troutville Elementary School - Troutville

References
Botetourt County Public Schools
Botetourt County School Board
Botetourt County Public Schools - Administration

School divisions in Virginia
Education in Botetourt County, Virginia